Oslo is the capital of Norway.
Oslo may also refer to:

Geography
 Gamlebyen in Oslo, Norway, was known as Oslo until 1925
 Oslo, Minnesota, a small city in northwest Minnesota, United States
 Oslo, Dodge County, Minnesota, an unincorporated community in southeast Minnesota, United States
 Oslo, Florida, an unincorporated community in Florida, United States
 Oslo (Hackney), an East London kitchen-bar-venue based in Hackney

Music
 Oslo (band), a Californian rock band
 Oslo (duo), runners-up in French Popstars in 2013, made up of Eugénie and Vincent
"Oslo", a song by the Disciples from Smoking Kills (album)
"Oslo", a song by Tumi and the Volume from Tumi and the Volume (album)
"Oslo", a song by Blonde Redhead from their 2010 album Penny Sparkle

Other uses 
 Oslo (play), a 2016 play by playwright J.T.Rogers
 Oslo, a character in the French show Skyland
 Open Source and Linux Organization, a project by Hewlett-Packard
 Optics Software for Layout and Optimization

See also
 Oslofjord, a fjord in the south-east of Norway
 Oslo class frigate, a class of ship design in the Royal Norwegian Navy
 The Oslo Accords between Israel and Palestinian representatives
 Oslo City (shopping center)
 Oslo Plads, a square in Copenhagen, Denmark